Susanne Hierl (born 29 September 1973) is a German lawyer and politician of the Christian Social Union (CSU) who has been serving as a member of the Bundestag since the 2021 elections, representing the Amberg constituency.

Early life
Hierl was born in Eichstätt and grew up in Postbauer-Heng. She graduated from the University of Regensburg.

Career
Hierl served as a councillor in Neumarkt district.

In parlimament, Hierl has been serving on the Committee on Legal Affairs and its Subcommittee on European Law. Since 2022, she has been part of a study commission set up to investigate the entire period of German involvement in Afghanistan from 2001 to 2021 and to draw lessons for  foreign and security policy in future.

Other activities
 Tarabya Cultural Academy, Member of the Advisory Board (since 2022)
 German Catholic Women's Association (KDFB), Member

See also 

 List of members of the 20th Bundestag

References 

Living people
1973 births
People from Eichstätt
People from Amberg

Members of the Bundestag for Bavaria
21st-century German women politicians
21st-century German politicians
Female members of the Bundestag
Members of the Bundestag for the Christian Social Union in Bavaria
University of Regensburg alumni
People from Neumarkt (district)